Narasimhanaickenpalayam is a part of Coimbatore city. It is about 14 km from Coimbatore city junction in the northern direction.  Narasimhanaickenpalayam is on the stretch of National Highway NH 67 Extn (NH-181) Mettupalayam Road, one of the arterial roads of Coimbatore city. Neighbouring places are Thudiyalur, NGGO Colony, and Periyanaickenpalayam

Demographics
 Indian census, Narasimhanaickenpalayam had a population of 17,858. Males constituted 51% of the population and females 49%. It had an average literacy rate of 78%, higher than the national average of 59.5%: male literacy is 83%, and female literacy is 73%. In Narasimhanaickenpalayam, 10% of the population is under 6 years of age.

 Indian census, Narasimhanaickenpalayam had 17,858 people in 5023 households. Males and females constituted 50% of the population; the average literacy rate was 81%: male literacy was 85%, and female literacy was 77%.

Geography
It is in the foothills of Kurudi Hills, Western Ghats. Narasimhanaickenpalayam is named after Lord Narsimha (Lord Vishnu); a temple is in Narasimhanaickenpalayam.

Transport

Road 
The main bus stand is Narasimhanaickenpalayam Busstand. 24-hour bus facility is available from Coimbatore Municipal Central Bus Stand, Thudiyalur and also from ooty, Mettupalayam.

Train 
There was a railway station in Narasimhanaickenpalayam. It was closed by the railway authorities even though people protested. Now there are local electric trains running four times a day between Coimbatore Junction and Mettupalayam, but they do not stop at Narasimhanaickenpalayam because there is no infrastructure for the  needs of passengers. Town Panchayat allotted land for constructing a Railway Station and works are going.

Residential locations

 Union Road 3rd Street
 Jothi Colony
 Kumaran Nagar
 Sri Lakshmi Nagar
 Thoppampatti
 Rakkipalayam
 Sri Balaji Nagar (Rakkipalayam)
 Vetrilaikalipalayam
 Kumarapuram
 Applupalayam
 Sakthi Nagar
 Bombay Nagar (Sri Ram Nagar)
 Poochiur
 Pudhupalayam
 Pudhupalayam (West street)
 Pudhupalayam (Surya Nagar)
 Balaji Nagar (Narasimhanaickenpalayam)
 Rajendra Nagar
 Surya Nagar
 Vignespuram
 Teachers Colony
 Padmalaya Nagar
 Lakshmi Nagar
 Dhanalakshmi Nagar
 N R S Nagar
 C.V.Gopal Nagar
 Anna Nagar
 Muthu Nagar
 P&T Colony
 Angalammanpuram
 Srinivasa Nagar
 Union road 1,2(North)
 Union road (West)
 Tank street
 MRG nagar
 Old Narasimhanaickenpalayam
 Krishnammal Nagar
 Venkatasalapathy layout
 Bhagavan Gardens Phase-3 and Phase-4
 Thendral nagar
 Ramasamy Nagar
Akkaya naidu street(Sowndamman veedhi)
Angannan street

Utilities
It has healthcare centers, shopping centers, restaurants, hotels, banks and a post office.

References

Cities and towns in Coimbatore district
Suburbs of Coimbatore